The 1901 Baltimore Orioles season finished with the Orioles in 5th in the American League with a record of 68–65. The team was managed by John McGraw and played at Oriole Park.

Regular season

Season standings

Record vs. opponents

Roster

Game log 

|-
|- align="center" bgcolor="bbffbb"
| 1 || April 26 || Americans || 10–6 || || || || || 1–0 || 
|- align="center" bgcolor="bbffbb"
| 2 || April 27 || Americans || 12–6 || || || || || 2–0 ||
|-"center" bgcolor="#ffbbbb"
| 3 || April 29 || Senators || 2–5 || || || || || 2–1|| 
|- "center" bgcolor="#ffbbbb"
| 3 || April 30 || Senators || 6–12 || || || || || 2–2 || 
|-

|-  style="text-align:center; bgcolor="ffbbbb"
|- align="center" bgcolor="bbffbb"
| 5 || May 1 || Senators || 6–4 || || || ||  || 3–2 ||
|- align="center" bgcolor="bbffbb"
| 6 || May 2 || Senators || 11–4 || || ||  || ||  4–2 ||
|- align="center" bgcolor="#ffbbbb"
| 7 || May 3 || Athletics || 4–9 || || ||  || || 4–3 ||
|- align="center" bgcolor="bbffbb"
| 8 || May 4 || Athletics || 11–7 || || ||  || || 5–3 ||
|- align="center" bgcolor="#ffbbbb"
| 9 || May 6 || Athletics || 5–6 || || ||  ||  || ||
|- align="center" bgcolor="bbffbb"
| 10 || May 7 || Athletics || 14–10 || || ||  ||  || ||
|- align="center" bgcolor="bbffbb"
| 11 || May 8 || Athletics || 5–1 || || ||  ||  || ||
|- align="center" bgcolor="#ffbbbb"
| 12 || May 11 || Athletics || 6–7 || || ||  || || ||
|- align="center" bgcolor="bbffbb"
| 13 || May 13 || Athletics || 14–5 || || ||  || || ||
|- align="center" bgcolor="bbffbb"
| 14 || May 14 || Athletics || 11–5 || || ||  || || || ||
|- align="center" bgcolor="bbffbb"
| 15 || May 15 || Athletics || 14–5 || || ||  || || || ||
|- align="center" bgcolor="bbffbb"
| 16 || May 16 || @ Americans || 8–7 || || ||  || || || ||
|- align="center" bgcolor="#ffbbbb"
| 17 || May 17 || @ Americans || 2–7 || || ||  || || || ||
|- align="center" bgcolor="#ffbbbb"
| 18 || May 25 || @ Brewers || 3–6 || || ||  || || || ||
|- align="center" bgcolor="#ffbbbb"
| 19 || May 26 || @ White Stockings || 0–5 || || || ||  || ||
|- align="center" bgcolor="#ffbbbb"
| 20 || May 27 || @ White Stockings || 3–10 || || || ||  || ||
|- align="center" bgcolor="bbffbb"
| 21 || May 28 || @ White Stockings || 14–5 || || || ||  || ||
|- align="center" bgcolor="#ffbbbb"
| 22 || May 29 || @ White Stockings || 4–7 || || || ||  || ||
|- align="center" bgcolor="bbffbb"
| 23 || May 30 || @ Tigers || 10–7 || || || ||  || || ||
|- align="center" bgcolor="#ffbbbb"
| 24 || May 30 || @ Tigers || 1–4 || || || ||  || || ||
|- align="center" bgcolor="#ffbbbb"
| 25 || May 31 || @ Tigers || 5–5 || || || || || || ||
|-

|- style="text-align:center; bgcolor="#bbffbb"
| 26 || June 1 || @ Tigers || 3–1 || || || ||  || || ||
|- style="text-align:center; bgcolor="#bbffbb"
| 27 || June 3 || @ Bluebirds || 7–2 || || || ||  || || ||
|- style="center" bgcolor="#ffbbbb"
| 28 || June 4 || @ Bluebirds || 1–5 || || || ||  || || ||
|- style="center" bgcolor="#ffbbbb"
| 29 || June 6 || @ Bluebirds || 2–4 || || || ||  || || ||
|-  style="text-align:center; bgcolor="#bbffbb"
| 30 || June 7 || Bluebirds || 10–9 || || || ||  || || ||
|- style="center" bgcolor="#ffbbbb"
| 31 || June 8 || Bluebirds || 5–13 || || || ||  || || ||
|- style="center" bgcolor="#ffbbbb"
| 32 || June 10 || Bluebirds || 6–13 || || || ||  || || ||
|- style="center" bgcolor="#ffbbbb"
| 33 || June 11 || Bluebirds || 5–8 || || || ||  || || ||
|- style="text-align:center; bgcolor="#bbffbb"
| 34 || June 12 || Bluebirds || 8–1 || || || ||  || || ||
|- style="center" bgcolor="#ffbbbb"
| 35 || June 13 || White Stockings || 0–12 || || || || || || ||
|- style="center" bgcolor="#ffbbbb"
| 36 || June 14 || White Stockings || 5–10 || || || ||  || || ||
|- style="center" bgcolor="#ffbbbb"
| 37 || June 17 || White Stockings || 6–7 || || || || || || ||
|- style="text-align:center; bgcolor="#bbffbb"
| 38 || June 18 || Brewers || 11–4 || || || ||  || || ||
|- style="text-align:center; bgcolor="#bbffbb"
| 39 || June 19 || Brewers || 9–3 || || || ||  || || ||
|- style="text-align:center; bgcolor="#bbffbb"
| 40 || June 20 || Brewers || 7–2 || || || ||  || || ||
|- style="text-align:center; bgcolor="#bbffbb"
| 41 || June 21 || Tigers || 4–3 || || || ||  || || ||
|- style="text-align:center; bgcolor="#bbffbb"
| 42 || June 22 || Tigers || 10–3 || || || ||  || || ||
|- style="text-align:center; bgcolor="#bbffbb"
| 43 || June 24 || Tigers || 17–8 || || || ||  || || ||
|- style="text-align:center; bgcolor="#bbffbb"
| 44 || June 25 || Tigers || 4–2 || || || ||  || || ||
|- style="text-align:center; bgcolor="#bbffbb"
| 45 || June 27 || Athletics  || 9–5 || || || ||  || || ||
|- style="text-align:center; bgcolor="#bbffbb"
| 46 || June 28 || Athletics  || 6–3 || || || ||  || || ||
|- style="text-align:center; bgcolor="#bbffbb"
| 47 || June 29 || Athletics  || 15–3 || || || || || || ||
|-

|- 
| 48 || July 1 || Americans || 7–5 || || || ||  || || ||
|- style=
| 49 || July 2 || Americans || 8–10 || || || ||  || || ||
|- style=
| 50 || July 3 || Americans || 1–9 || || || ||  || || ||
|- style=
| 51 || July 4 || Americans || 2–10 || || || ||  || || ||
|- style=
| 52 || July 4 || Americans || 3–8 || || || ||  || || ||
|- style=
| 53 || July 5 || Athletics || 5–3 || || || ||  || || ||
|- style=
| 54 || July 6 || Athletics || 5–8 || || || ||  || || ||
|- style=
| 55 || July 8 || Senators || 8–7 || || || ||  || || ||
|- style=
| 56 || July 9 || Senators || 3–1 || || || ||  || || ||
|- style=
| 57 || July 10 || Senators || 5–1 || || || ||  || || ||
|- style=
| 58 || July 11 || Senators || 6–2 || || || ||  || || ||
|- style=
| 59 || July 12 || Senators || 12–14 || || || ||  || || ||
|- style=
| 60 || July 15 || Senators || 2–3 || || || ||  || || ||
|- style=
| 60 || July 15 || Senators || 7–3 || || || ||  || || ||
|- style=
| 61 || July 17 || @ White Stockings || 2–4 || || || ||  || || ||
|- style=
| 62 || July 18 || @ White Stockings || 1–9 || || || ||  || || ||
|- style=
| 63 || July 19 || @ White Stockings || 7–4 || || || ||  || || ||
|- style=
| 64 || July 20 || @ Brewers || 13–11 || || || ||  || || ||
|- style=
| 65 || July 21 || @ Brewers || 10–6 || || || ||  || || ||
|- style=
| 66 || July 21 || @ Brewers || 7–5 || || || ||  || || ||
|- style=
| 67 || July 22 || @ Brewers || 3–5 || || || ||  || || ||
|- style=
| 68 || July 24 || @ Bluebirds || 9–6 || || || ||  || || ||
|- style=
| 69 || July 25 || @ Bluebirds || 5–1 || || || ||  || || ||
|- style=
| 70 || July 26 || @ Bluebirds || 6–1 || || || ||  || || ||
|- style=
| 71 || July 27 || @Tigers || 0–1 || || || ||  || || ||
|- style=
| 72 || July 28 || @ Tigers || 4–6 || || || ||  || || ||
|- style=
| 73 || July 29 || @ Tigers || 10–5 || || || ||  || || ||
|- style=
| 74 || July 31 || @ Tigers || 4–6 || || || ||  || || ||
|-

Player stats

Batting

Starters by position 
Note: Pos = Position; G = Games played; AB = At bats; H = Hits; Avg. = Batting average; HR = Home runs; RBI = Runs batted in

Other batters 
Note: G = Games played; AB = At bats; H = Hits; Avg. = Batting average; HR = Home runs; RBI = Runs batted in

Pitching

Starting pitchers 
Note: G = Games pitched; IP = Innings pitched; W = Wins; L = Losses; ERA = Earned run average; SO = Strikeouts

Other pitchers 
Note: G = Games pitched; IP = Innings pitched; W = Wins; L = Losses; ERA = Earned run average; SO = Strikeouts

References 
 1901 Baltimore Orioles team page at Baseball Reference
 Baltimore Orioles team page at www.baseball-almanac.com

Inaugural Major League Baseball seasons by team
Baltimore Orioles season
Balt